The Marshalsea Court (or Court of the Marshalsea, also known as the Court of the Verge or the Court of the Marshal and Steward) was a court associated with the Royal Household in England. Associated with, but distinct from, the Marshalsea Court was the Palace Court.

The Marshalsea Court
It was a court of record held by the Steward and Marshal of the Royal Household, to administer justice between the sovereign's domestic servants "that they might not be drawn into other courts and their service lost".  It dealt with cases of trespass committed within the verge of the court, fixed at 12 miles round the sovereign's residence, if only one party was in the sovereign's service, and with debts, contracts and covenants, where both parties belonged to the royal household, in which case the inquest was composed of men from the royal household only. Its criminal jurisdiction had long fallen into disuse by the time its civil jurisdiction was belatedly abolished in 1849.

Associated with the court was the Marshalsea Prison.  Originally the prison of the Court of the Marshalsea and known from about 1300, it was on a site in Mermaid Court, Southwark until relocated to a site off Borough High Street in 1811. Here it largely functioned as a debtor's prison until 1842 when its role was taken over by the Queen's Bench Prison.

The Palace Court

In 1630 Charles I created by letters patent (renewed in 1665) a new court called the Palace Court to be held by the Steward of the Household and Knight Marshal, and the steward of the court or his deputy, and having jurisdiction to hear all kinds of personal actions between parties within twelve miles of Whitehall Palace (the jurisdiction of the Marshalsea court, the City of London, and Westminster Hall being excepted). It differed from the Marshalsea court in that it had no jurisdiction over the sovereign's household, nor were its suitors necessarily of the household. The privilege of practising before the palace court was limited to four counsel.

In some cases, the counsel practising before both the Marshalsea Court and the Palace Court overlapped, as was the case with the Lincoln's Inn barrister Levett Blackborne, grandson of Sir Richard Levett, former Lord Mayor of London. Blackborne served as steward of both courts, as did several other barristers.

The Palace Court was held weekly together with the ancient Court of Marshalsea. The court was abolished in 1849.

References

British monarchy
Marshalsea
Former courts and tribunals in England and Wales
1849 disestablishments in England
Courts and tribunals disestablished in 1849